Peyton may refer to:


People and fictional characters
 Peyton (name), a list of people and fictional characters with the given name or surname
 Peyton (musician), American singer-songwriter Peyton Nicole Booker (born 1997)

Places in the United States
 Peyton, Colorado, an unincorporated town and census-designated place
 Peyton, Claiborne County, Mississippi, an unincorporated community
 Peyton, Tunica County, Mississippi, a ghost town
 Peyton, Texas, an unincorporated community
 Peyton, Wisconsin, an unincorporated community
 Fort Peyton, constructed in 1837 to protect the St. Augustine, Florida, area during the Second Seminole War
 Peyton Field at Baker Stadium, Tacoma, Washington, a multi-purpose stadium

Other uses
 Peyton baronets, five titles, all extinct
 USS Peyton (PF-91), a United States Navy patrol frigate which served in the Royal Navy as the frigate  from 1944 to 1945
 Peyton Company, a defunct wooden shipbuilding and dry dock company in Newport Beach, California, United States

See also
 Peyton House (disambiguation), also Peyton Building
 Peyton Place (disambiguation) 
 Payton (disambiguation) 
 Paton (disambiguation)